The Hand That Rocks the Cradle is a 1992 American psychological thriller film directed by Curtis Hanson, and starring Annabella Sciorra, Rebecca De Mornay, Matt McCoy, Ernie Hudson, and Julianne Moore. Its plot follows the pregnant wife of a Seattle obstetrician who kills himself after he is accused of sexual misconduct by his patients. The shock leads the wife to miscarry, after which she poses as a nanny for one of her husband's accusers, and slowly begins to infiltrate the family. The title is taken from an 1865 poem by William Ross Wallace and there are several nods to the comic opera The Pirates of Penzance.  The Hand That Rocks the Cradle grossed approximately $140 million worldwide. The film was remade into a Hindi film by the name Khal-Naaikaa in 1993.

Plot
In Seattle, housewife Claire Bartel is happily married and pregnant with her second child. At a routine check-up, she is sexually molested by her new obstetrician, Dr. Victor Mott. Traumatized, she tells her husband Michael, who encourages her to report Dr. Mott to the state medical board. Her accusation prompts four more women to come forward about Dr. Mott assaulting them, and multiple charges are prepared against him. Dr. Mott commits suicide to avoid being arrested. Lawyers tell Mott's pregnant widow that her husband's assets have been frozen because of the lawsuits. They also reveal that he voided his life insurance contract by committing suicide, and she will lose her luxurious home. Stressed, Mrs. Mott goes into pre-term labor, loses her baby, and undergoes an emergency hysterectomy. While recovering, she sees a news story identifying Claire as the first woman who came forward with the allegations against her husband.

Six months later, Claire has given birth to a boy, Joey. Looking for a nanny, she unknowingly hires Mrs. Mott, who is going under the alias "Peyton Flanders". Mott wages a campaign to undermine Claire in her household, seeking revenge against Claire for reporting her husband in spite of his behavior, as her husband was her only chance to have children. She frequently breastfeeds Joey in secret; this causes him to stop taking Claire's milk. Mott tries to turn Claire's daughter Emma against her and secretly destroys Michael's office proposal. Solomon, an intellectually disabled handyman who has been assisting the Bartels, discovers Mott breastfeeding Joey. To prevent him from exposing her, Mrs. Mott implies to Claire that she believes Solomon may be molesting Emma. Mott plants a pair of Emma's underwear in Solomon's toolbox, leading Claire to fire him, to Emma's disappointment and causing her to become distant from her mother as Mott had planned. Unknown to the family except for Emma, Solomon keeps his watchful eyes over them. Knowing that Claire's close friend Marlene had been Michael's ex-girlfriend before he married Claire, Mott suggests to Michael that he arrange a surprise birthday party for Claire, leading Marlene and Michael to meet in secret. Claire accuses Michael of having an affair with Marlene, only to find the party-goers waiting in the next room.

A now wary Claire begins to suspect "Peyton's" hand in all of these incidents and suggests to Michael that they should take a family vacation without "Peyton". Mott overhears this and boobytraps the greenhouse for Claire. Marlene discovers Mott's identity, but before she can tell Claire, Mott tricks her into going into the greenhouse, where she is killed by the falling glass ceiling. Knowing that Claire suffers from asthma, Mott empties all of her inhalers. When Claire finds Marlene's bloodied body, she has an asthma attack and is briefly hospitalized. Michael is left distraught over Marlene's death and his wife's condition; Mott attempts to seduce him, but he rejects her. Claire uncovers the truth about Mott, and confronts her while revealing the truth to Michael. They kick her out, and Michael tells Claire to get Emma and Joey so they can head to a hotel for safety.

Mott breaks into the house and hits Michael with a shovel, knocking him down the stairs and breaking his legs. She then attempts to fulfill her true goal: taking Emma and Joey for herself, but after seeing Mott assault her mother, Emma outsmarts Mott and locks her in the nursery, declaring that Mott will never be her mother. Mott escapes and finds Solomon in the attic, aiding the kids' escape. She attempts to kill Claire but stops after Claire appears to be having another asthma attack, prompting Mott to mock her. As she tries to take Joey, Claire gets up, having faked her asthma attack, and viciously attacks a stunned Mott, and Solomon distracts her enough for Claire to push Mott out of the window, impaling her on the picket fence and killing her. Touched at how Solomon risked his life to protect her family, Claire welcomes him back, and they all leave the attic to help Michael up as the police and paramedics arrive.

Cast

Production
The Hand That Rocks the Cradle originated as Silver's film school thesis.

In August 1990, it was reported that Interscope Communications was preparing the film for Hollywood Pictures. By October 1990 Curtis Hanson was on board to direct.
Filming began on April 15, 1991 after being rescheduled from February 22. The film shoot was delayed due to the casting of the female leads. The setting and location was originally meant to be in Atlanta, Georgia, but was filmed in Tacoma and Seattle in Washington.

Filming locations

Filming locations were Issaquah, Washington; Seattle, Washington (Mott's residence at 2502 37th Ave W in Seattle); and the Bartels' residence at 808 N. Yakima Ave. Tacoma, Washington.

Release

Box office
The Hand That Rocks the Cradle opened on January 10, 1992, and grossed $7.7 million in its opening weekend, bringing Hook down to #2 at the US box office from its four-week stay at #1. The film lasted at #1 for four consecutive weeks, then was upended by Medicine Man, which was also released by Hollywood Pictures. By the end of its run, the film earned a total of $88 million in the United States and Canada and $52 million internationally, for a worldwide total of $140 million.

It was placed at #24 in Bravo's special 30 Even Scarier Movie Moments.

Critical response
On Rotten Tomatoes the film has an approval rating of 65% based on 51 reviews. On Metacritic the film has a score of 64% based on reviews from 26 critics. Audiences polled by CinemaScore gave the film an average grade of "A−" on an A+ to F scale.

Gene Siskel stated that he "had trouble accepting the premise of this picture because of the casual way in which the nanny is hired in an early scene by the mother," citing that the premise is unrealistic. However, he gave praise to Julianne Moore's character, saying, "much more believable, is the supporting character of the mother's best friend" and that "the friend is a terrific character, it's too bad she doesn't have more scenes in the picture." He mentioned that his "biggest objection to Hand That Rocks the Cradle is to its scenes with the children in jeopardy or psychic pain." Siskel finally remarked that "there are some fun thrills in The Hand that Rocks the Cradle to be sure, but I found a lot of it distasteful, too." Roger Ebert had a higher opinion of the film, stating that he "found this film worked" and that "It touches on a fear and that's why it appeals to us." Ebert praised De Mornay's performance in the film, saying, "she does, I think, a very good job, a very, very sound job of being the villainess in this film and I think it's an effective performance" and that he found the scenes of the children "very interesting because I saw them as a portrait of the evil of that woman."

Vincent Canby of The New York Times said of the film that "The Hand That Rocks the Cradle is meant to scare audiences more or less in the way that the patrons of the early nickelodeons were frightened when they saw the image of a train rushing at them. Audiences aren't asked to think, only to react" and that "The Hand That Rocks the Cradle proves again that not thinking isn't especially easy even today. Though Mr. Hanson is a slick movie maker, he is not an especially persuasive one here. Don't be gulled by those who would compare The Hand That Rocks the Cradle to Fatal Attraction, which features three strong characters who, in one way or another, are ready to answer for their actions." He added that "Mr. Hanson creates the occasionally effective shock effect to satisfy those who want to squeal in mock fright. More often the devices he uses are such tired tricks as the crosscutting between two sets of simultaneous, often innocent, actions to create the illusion of suspense that can't be sustained." Rebecca Hawkes of The Daily Telegraph gave the film a rating a 3 stars out of 5 and said that "It’s a tense, viscerally unsettling moment, that helps make the film into something more than just a fun, formulaic thriller", while Sue Heal of The Radio Times rated the film 4 stars out of 5, stated that "This is pure unbridled hokum, of course, but extremely effective until the last 30 minutes, when the plot rapidly self-destructs."

Washington Post reviewer Rita Kempley criticized the movie, arguing that it is anti-feminist.

Home media
The Hand That Rocks the Cradle was released on VHS on July 8, 1992, on DVD on December 8, 1998 with the original theatrical trailer as the sole special feature. On September 4, 2012 Disney/Buena Vista released the film on Blu-ray Disc with the same theatrical trailer as the previous releases.
The film was presented in its original widescreen aspect ratio, approximately 1.85:1.

Remake 
In 1993, it was remade as Khal-Naaikaa, and released on 6 August 1993, it received mixed reviews and was declared a failure.

Attempted remake 
In 2013, it was announced Supernatural writer Daniel Loflin was set to executive produce and write an adaptation for the film alongside Ted Field, a producer on the original film. The remake was reportedly in development at ABC Family, but it did not move forward.

See also 
 List of films featuring home invasions
 List of mental disorders in film

References

External links

 
 
 
 
 Movie stills

1990s English-language films
1990s American films
1992 drama films
1992 films
1990s mystery thriller films
1990s psychological thriller films
American mystery thriller films
American psychological thriller films
American thriller drama films
Films scored by Graeme Revell
Films about narcissism
American films about revenge
Films about stalking
Films directed by Curtis Hanson
Films set in Seattle
Films shot in Washington (state)
Hollywood Pictures films
Films shot in Seattle
Home invasions in film
Films about nannies
American pregnancy films
Interscope Communications films
Adultery in films
Films about self-harm
Films with screenplays by Rick Jaffa and Amanda Silver
Films about medical malpractice